Beijo is a song by Romanian music group Morandi. The song's lyrics are sung in Portuguese. The song was a popular summer hit in Romania in 2005, and in July of that year, reached number 1 on the MTV Europe and World Chart Express charts, overtaking singles by Coldplay, U2 and Shakira.

Charts

See also
List of Romanian Top 100 number ones of the 2000s

References

Number-one singles in Romania
Romanian songs
2005 songs
Songs written by Marius Moga